Villafranca Tirrena is a comune (municipality) in the Metropolitan City of Messina in the Italian region Sicily, located about  east of Palermo and about  northwest of Messina.

Villafranca Tirrena borders the following municipalities: Messina, Saponara.

References

External links

 Official website

Cities and towns in Sicily